Nicolas "Nico" Marlet is a French-American animator and character designer employed by DreamWorks Animation. He is best known for his character design work on films in the Kung Fu Panda and How to Train Your Dragon franchises, as well as Disney television shows such as TaleSpin and DuckTales. He also worked on an unproduced animated version of Andrew Lloyd Webber's Cats at DreamWorks' predecessor studio, Amblimation. His work has appeared in several "art of" books, including The Art of Kung Fu Panda, The Art of How to Train Your Dragon, The Art of Bee Movie, and his own limited edition sketchbook containing some of his personal works.

Animation credits  
  DuckTales the Movie: Treasure of the Lost Lamp (animator) - 1990
  TaleSpin – Plunder & Lightning (animator) - 1990
  We're Back! A Dinosaur's Story (animator) - 1993
  Balto (character designer, supervising animator: "Muk and Luk") - 1995
  The Prince of Egypt (character designer) - 1998
  The Road to El Dorado (character designer, supervising animator: "Armadillo") - 2000
  Monsters, Inc. (visual development) - 2001
  Sinbad: Legend of the Seven Seas (character designer) - 2003
  Madagascar (additional character designer) - 2005
  Over the Hedge (character designer) - 2006
  Bee Movie (character designer) - 2007
  French Roast (character designer) - 2008
  Kung Fu Panda (character designer) - 2008
  Kung Fu Panda: Secrets of the Furious Five (character designer) - 2008
  How to Train Your Dragon (character designer) - 2010 
  Kung Fu Panda Holiday Special (character designer) - 2010
  Kung Fu Panda 2 (character designer) - 2011
  Book of Dragons (character designer) - 2011
  Dragons: Riders of Berk (character designer for 1 episode) - We Are a Family Part II - 2013
  How to Train Your Dragon 2 (character designer) - 2014
  Mune: Guardian of the Moon (character designer & production designer) - 2014
  Kung Fu Panda 3 (character designer) - 2016
  How to Train Your Dragon: The Hidden World (character designer) - 2019
  Abominable (character designer) - 2019

References 

 Character Design Notes Blog: Nico Marlet November 4, 2010.
 'Panda' designer breaks it down: How Nicolas Marlet mastered art of 'Kung Fu' May 28, 2008.

External links 

Living people
French emigrants to the United States
American animators
Annie Award winners
DreamWorks Animation people
Year of birth missing (living people)